Hylophorbus infulatus is a species of frog in the family Microhylidae. It is endemic to New Guinea and known from its type locality, Arau in the Kratke Mountains, as well as from the Adelbert Range, both in Papua New Guinea. Common name Arau archipelago frog has been proposed for it.

Description
Hylophorbus infulatus is a relatively slender and long-legged frog. The head is narrower than the body. The eyes are relatively large. The tympanum is indistinct, as is the supratympanic fold. The fingers and toes have small, grooved discs. The back is brown with indistinct brown mottling, surrounded by two dorsolateral dark-brown bands alluded to in its specific name infulatus, which is Latin for "adorned with a band". The bands are sharply delimited towards the light gray-brown flanks and belly. The throat is heavily mottled with brown. Males have a single subgular vocal sac.

Habitat and conservation
Males call from exposed positions on the forest floor. It has been recorded as reasonably common where it has been encountered. Threats to this species are unknown. It is not known to occur in any protected areas.

References

infulatus
Amphibians of Papua New Guinea
Amphibians of New Guinea
Endemic fauna of Papua New Guinea
Endemic fauna of New Guinea
Taxa named by Richard G. Zweifel
Amphibians described in 1972
Taxonomy articles created by Polbot